The pelvic portion of each sympathetic trunk is situated in front of the sacrum, medial to the anterior sacral foramina. It consists of four or five small sacral ganglia, connected together by interganglionic cords, and continuous above with the abdominal portion. Below, the two pelvic sympathetic trunks converge, and end on the front of the coccyx in a small ganglion, the ganglion impar, also known as azygos  or ganglion of Walther.

Clinical significance 
A study found that in some cases a single injection of nerve block at the ganglion impar offered complete relief from coccydynia.

References 

 Munir MA, Zhang J, Ahmad M. (2004) "A modified needle-inside-needle technique for the ganglion impar block." Can J Anaesth. 2004 Nov;51(9):915-7.

External links 
 "Ganglion Impar Injections to Treat Tailbone Pain" at www.TailboneDoctor.com
 "Treatment of coccydynia by injection of local anesthetic to the ganglion impar", at coccyx.org
 
Tailbone pain (coccyx pain, coccydynia) Peer-reviewed medical article online at eMedicine (Medscape)

Autonomic ganglia